Quercus lusitanica, commonly known as gall oak, Lusitanian oak, or dyer's oak, is a species of oak native to Portugal, Spain (Galicia and western Andalucia) and Morocco. Quercus lusitanica is the source of commercial nutgalls. These galls are produced by the infection from the insect Cynips gallae tinctoriae. They are used for dyeing.

Several other species are known colloquially as "gall oaks;"  indeed, galls can be found on a large percentage of oak species. The specific epithet "lusitanica" refers to the ancient Roman Province of Lusitania, corresponding roughly to present-day Portugal and Extremadura in Spain.

Description

The plant mainly spreads through various suckers.

Taxonomy 
It was incorrectly named Q. humilis, later Q. fruticosa and its current name was incorrectly used to identify other Gall oaks from the Iberian Peninsula and North Africa. This resulted in numerous taxonomy errors in the Gall oaks taxa from the occidental and oriental Mediterranean Basin.

Distribution and habitat
Quercus lusitanica is native to the Iberian Peninsula (in Portugal and western Andalusia, Spain, also rare on Galicia) and Morocco It is commonly associated in oak and pine forests and does well in acidic soils. It favors mild coastal Mediterranean climates but it also succeeds in moist, mild, maritime climates.

Threats
No serious threats were found in Portugal, though in Andalusia this plant has been listed as Near Threatened due to fires, silviculture and grazing ungulates. The main threat to the conservation of genetic diversity of this species is the hybridization with the oak neighbors (Holm Oak, Cork Oak, Kermes Oak, Pyrenean Oak).

References

lusitanica
Flora of Spain
Flora of Portugal
Trees of Morocco
Trees of Mediterranean climate
Oak galls
Plants described in 1785
Plant dyes